Sreepur is an upazila (sub-district) of Gazipur District in central Bangladesh, part of the Dhaka Division.

Geography
It has 65435 households and total area 465.24 km2.

Demographics
At the 1991 census Bangladesh census, Sreepur had a population of 320,530, of which 166,988 were aged 18 or older. Males constituted 51.13% of the population, and females 48.87%. Sreepur had an average literacy rate of 30.3% (7+ years), against the national average of 32.4%.

Administration
Sreepur Upazila is divided into Sreepur Municipality and eight union parishads: Barmi, Gazipur, Gosinga, Kaoraid, Maona, Prahladpur, Rajabari, and Telihati. The union parishads are subdivided into 81 mauzas and 172 villages.

Sreepur Municipality is subdivided into 9 wards and 20 mahallas.

See also 
 Upazilas of Bangladesh
 Districts of Bangladesh
 Divisions of Bangladesh

References

External links
 Official Website

Upazilas of Gazipur District